Club Sportiv Municipal Moinești, commonly known as CSM Moinești, or simply as Moinești, is a Romanian amateur football club based in Moinești, Bacău County, founded in 1948 under the name of Petrolul Moinești. The club was declared bankrupt in 2009 and was re-founded as CSM Moinești. CSM is currently playing in the Liga IV and never played higher than Liga II, second tier of the Romanian football league system.

History 
The club was founded in 1948 as Petrolul Moinești and takes its name from the oil production in the Moinești region. In 1950 the name was changed to Flacăra Moinești. Renamed as Energia Moinești, the club played for the first time in Divizia C in the 1956 season finishing eighth in Series I. The next season  took again the name Petrolul Moinești finishing the 1957–58 season in seventh place.

Led by Emil Vlăduț, Petrolul Moinești won the Series I of the 2002–03 Divizia C season, with three points in front of the main contenders FC Vaslui and Laminorul Roman, gaining immediate promotion back to Second Division.

Chronology of names

Honours
Liga III
Winners (4): 1971–72, 1995–96, 2000–01, 2002–03
Runners-up (4): 1972–73, 1974–75, 1975–76, 1993–94
Liga IV – Bacău County
Winners (3): 1992–93, 2007–08, 2011–12

League history

References

External links
 

Association football clubs established in 1948
Football clubs in Bacău County
Liga II clubs
Liga III clubs
Liga IV clubs
1948 establishments in Romania